Olivier Philippaerts (born 1993) is a Belgian show jumping rider. He is a native of Genk, Limburg, Belgium. He is the son of Ludo Philippaerts and twin brother of Nicola Philippaerts, both show jumping riders as well.

Together with his father and brother, and Olympic Gold Medal winner Jos Lansink, he finished third at the 2012 Piazza di Siena FEI Nations Cup of Italy. On 9 September 2012, he became the youngest rider ever to win the CN International Grand Prix at the 2012 CSIO Spruce Meadows 'Masters' Tournament.

References

External links 
Official website

Belgian show jumping riders
Belgian male equestrians
1993 births
Living people
Sportspeople from Genk
Belgian twins
Twin sportspeople
21st-century Belgian people